The Men's 400 metre individual medley competition of the 2014 FINA World Swimming Championships (25 m) was held on 4 December.

Records
Prior to the competition, the existing world and championship records were as follows.

Results

Heats
The heats were held at 10:09.

Final
The final was held at 18:14.

References

Men's 400 metre individual medley